Matagorda County is a county located in the U.S. state of Texas. As of the 2020 census, the population was 36,255. Its county seat is Bay City, not to be confused with the larger Baytown in Harris and Chambers Counties. Matagorda County is named for the canebrakes that once grew along the coast (matagorda is a Spanish word meaning "thick bush").

Matagorda County comprises the Bay City, TX Micropolitan Statistical Area, which is also included in the Houston-The Woodlands, TX combined statistical area.

Geography
The water area includes Matagorda Bay. It borders the Gulf of Mexico.

Major highways
  State Highway 35
  State Highway 60
  State Highway 71
  State Highway 111

Adjacent counties
 Brazoria County (northeast)
 Calhoun County (southwest)
 Jackson County (west)
 Wharton County (northwest)

National protected areas
 Big Boggy National Wildlife Refuge
 San Bernard National Wildlife Refuge (part)

Demographics

Note: the US Census treats Hispanic/Latino as an ethnic category. This table excludes Latinos from the racial categories and assigns them to a separate category. Hispanics/Latinos can be of any race.

As of the census of 2000,  37,957 people, 13,901 households, and 9,925 families were residing in the county.  The population density was 34 people per square mile (13/km2).  The 18,611 housing units averaged 17 per mi2 (6/km2).  The racial makeup of the county was 67.83% White, 12.72% African American, 0.67% Native American, 2.38% Asian,  14.02% from other races, and 2.38% from two or more races.  About 31.35% of the population were Hispanic or Latino of any race. By ancestry, 10.3% were of German, 8.2% American, 5.4% English, and 5.2% Irish  according to Census 2000, and 73.9% spoke English, 24.0% Spanish, and 1.6% Vietnamese as their first language.

Of the 13,901 households, 36.70% had children under the age of 18 living with them, 53.80% were married couples living together, 12.70% had a female householder with no husband present, and 28.60% were not families. About 25.10% of all households were made up of individuals, and 10.40% had someone living alone who was 65 years of age or older.  The average household size was 2.70, and the average family size was 3.25.

In the county, the age distribution was 30.00% under the age of 18, 8.90% from 18 to 24, 26.90% from 25 to 44, 21.80% from 45 to 64, and 12.40% who were 65 years of age or older.  The median age was 35 years. For every 100 females, there were 98.60 males.  For every 100 females age 18 and over, there were 95.50 males.

The median income for a household in the county was $32,174, and for a family was $40,586. Males had a median income of $37,733 versus $21,871 for females. The per capita income for the county was $15,709.  About 14.90% of families and 18.50% of the population were below the poverty line, including 23.00% of those under age 18 and 13.60% of those age 65 or over.

Economy

Rice is grown extensively in Matagorda County, as are St. Augustine and other turf grasses. In addition to a wealth of offshore oil rigs and natural gas extraction facilities all over the county, two petrochemical processing plants (Celanese and Equistar) and the South Texas Project nuclear power plant operate within the county. Matagorda County has secluded, extensive forests, wetlands, prairie, and coastal regions. The Gulf Coast floodplain has several conditions conducive to a variety of ecosystems and recreational activities evident by the highest count of migrating birds in the United States. Fishing (on- and offshore), hunting, and scuba diving are large parts of the recreation industry due to the Colorado River, the forests and Matagorda Bay. The Rio Colorado Golf Course and a birdwatching park are on the Colorado River near the State Highway 35 bridge, and a significant number of wildlife preserves are located around the county, a portion of which is land bought for that purpose by the two major petrochemical refineries and nuclear plant in the county.

Education
School districts serving Matagorda County include:
 Bay City Independent School District
 Boling Independent School District (partial)
 Matagorda Independent School District
 Palacios Independent School District (partial)
 Tidehaven Independent School District
 Van Vleck Independent School District

Communities

Cities
 Bay City (county seat)
 Palacios

Census-designated places
 Blessing
 Markham
 Matagorda
 Van Vleck

Unincorporated communities

 Allenhurst
 Buckeye
 Caney
 Cedar Lake
 Cedar Lane
 Collegeport
 El Maton
 Hawkinsville
 Midfield
 Pledger
 Sargent
 Wadsworth

Ghost towns
 Hawley

Notable people
 James Boyd Hawkins, a planter and rancher, the founder of Hawkins Plantation.
Charlie Siringo
 Hortense Sparks Ward
 Priscilla Richman, Chief Judge of the Fifth Circuit
 William Abrams (W.A.) Price, the first black attorney, the first black judge, and the first black man elected county attorney in the state of Texas.

Gallery

Politics

See also

 List of museums in the Texas Gulf Coast
 National Register of Historic Places listings in Matagorda County, Texas
 Recorded Texas Historic Landmarks in Matagorda County

References

External links

 
 
 "Matagorda County Profile" from the Texas Association of Counties

 
1836 establishments in the Republic of Texas
Populated places established in 1836
Greater Houston
Majority-minority counties in Texas